Don't Say Goodbye is the thirteenth studio album by English band Strawbs.The album featured material originally recorded for the unreleased album "Heartbreak Hill" using the same arrangements. "Heartbreak Hill" was later released in 1995 eight years after this album was released.

Track listing

Side one
"A Boy and his Dog" (Dave Cousins, Chris Parren) – 5:06
"Let it Rain" (Cousins, Chas Cronk, Andy Richards) – 4:55
"We Can Make it Together" (Cousins, Cronk) – 3:33
"Tina Dei Fada" (Richard Hudson) – 3:52
"Big Brother" (Hudson) – 3:05

Side two
"Something for Nothing" (Cousins, Cronk) – 6:35
"Evergreen" (Cousins) – 4:47
"That's When the Crying Starts" (Cousins) – 4:06
"Beat the Retreat" (Cousins) – 5:06

Personnel

Dave Cousins – lead vocals, backing vocals, acoustic guitar, electric guitar, banjo
Tony Hooper – lead vocals (7), backing vocals, acoustic guitar
Richard Hudson – lead vocals (5), backing vocals, drums, acoustic guitar
Brian Willoughby – guitars
Rod Demick – bass guitar, backing vocals
Chris Parren – keyboards

Recording

Recorded at E-Zee Studios, London and Southern Music Studios, London.

Strawbs – producers
Colin Legget – engineer
Ian Remmer – assistant engineer
George Peckham – mastering

Recording history

References
Don't Say Goodbye on Strawbsweb
Sleeve notes on CD RGF/WC DCD039 Don't Say Goodbye/Ringing Down the Years 2-CD set

Notes

Strawbs albums
1987 albums